Marcelle Derrien (1916–2008) was a French stage and film actress.

Selected filmography
 Man About Town (1947)
 Impeccable Henri (1948)
 Dark Sunday (1948)
 The Secret of Monte Cristo (1948)
  (1950)

References

Bibliography
 Goble, Alan. The Complete Index to Literary Sources in Film. Walter de Gruyter, 1999.

External links

1916 births
2008 deaths
French film actresses
20th-century French women